Alaska Patrol is a 1949 American action film directed by Jack Bernhard and written by Arthur Hoerl. The film stars Richard Travis, Helen Westcott, Emory Parnell, Richard Fraser, James Griffith and Ralf Harolde. The film was released on March 10, 1949, by Film Classics.

Plot

Cast          
Richard Travis as Tom Norman / Paul Rattick
Helen Westcott as Mary Lynn
Emory Parnell as Captain Jan Roburt
Richard Fraser as Operative Farrell 
James Griffith as Operative Dale 
Ralf Harolde as Edward Steele
Selmer Jackson as Captain Wright
Gene Roth as Ehrlich
William Tannen as Dajek
Otto Reichow as Eric Balser
Pierre Watkin as Mr. Sigmund
Paul Bryar as Commander Braddock
William Haade as Andrus
Jason Robards Sr. as Dr. Loring

References

External links
 

1949 films
American action films
1940s action films
Film Classics films
Films directed by Jack Bernhard
American black-and-white films
1940s English-language films
1940s American films